Paolo Ferreri (2 January 1948 – 14 July 2017), known as Paul Ferreri, was an Italian/Australian professional super fly/bantam/super bantam/feather/super featherweight boxer of the 1970s and '80s who won the Australian bantamweight title, Australian featherweight title, Australian super featherweight title, holding all three Australian titles simultaneously, Commonwealth bantamweight title (twice), and inaugural Commonwealth super bantamweight title, and was a challenger for the World Boxing Council (WBC) bantamweight title against Carlos Zárate, his professional fighting weight varied from , i.e. super flyweight to , i.e. super featherweight. He was inducted into the Australian National Boxing Hall of Fame in 2006.

He died on 14 July 2017 at the age of 69.

Professional boxing record

References

External links

Image - Paul Ferreri

1948 births
2017 deaths
Australian male boxers
Bantamweight boxers
Featherweight boxers
Flyweight boxers
Sportspeople from the Province of Enna
Boxers from Melbourne
Italian male boxers
Commonwealth Boxing Council champions